Two ships of the United States Navy have been named Conway, after William Conway,  who refused to haul down his country's flag during the surrender of the Pensacola Navy Yard.

 , a new name for the  USS Craven (DD-70), launched in 1918 and renamed in 1939. She was transferred to the Royal Navy as HMS Lewes, in 1940. She was scrapped in 1945.

Sources

United States Navy ship names